Hymenocallis longibracteata Hochr. is a bulb-forming perennial native to the State of Veracruz in eastern Mexico. The plant has showy white flowers with a prominent white corona and narrow, reflexed tepals.

References

longibracteata
Flora of Veracruz
Plants described in 1910